Håkon Jacobsen (born 1962) is a Norwegian engineer and executive officer. Since 2008 he has been CEO of Blom.

Biography
Jacobsen is educated with a MSc in Engineering from the Norwegian Institute of Technology. He worked for 20 years as a consultant, and later partner in Accenture before he was hired by Blom. In Accenture he worked within telecom and high tech, and lived six years in Beijing, China.

References

1962 births
Living people
Norwegian businesspeople
Norwegian engineers
Norwegian Institute of Technology alumni
Norwegian expatriates in China